Bear Creek Lake State Park is a  state park located in Cumberland, Virginia, United States.  It is a recreational and camping facility that surrounds an artificial  lake situated in the  Cumberland State Forest. As of 2013, the yearly visitation was 78,288.

History
Bear Creek Lake was built by members of the Civilian Conservation Corps in 1938 as a project of the Virginia Department of Agriculture through the State Forestry Division. The lake was built using labor from local carpenters, farmers and un-skilled laborers seeking jobs. In addition to the lake, two pavilions, a concession stand and six fireplaces were constructed. In 1940, the area opened as a forestry wayside with boat rentals and swimming. In 1958, the area was given to the Division of State Parks and was operated as a day-use recreation area. In 1962, the division added campgrounds and the area's name was changed to Bear Creek Lake State Park.

Attractions
The park features a  lake with a boat launch, fishing pier, boat rentals and a swimming beach. Visitors will also find a meeting facility, cabins, camping, picnicking, an archery range and playgrounds. Guests also enjoy the park's nine trails and access to the adjoining  Cumberland State Forest, including the  Cumberland Multi-use Trail. This trail is available for hiking, biking and horseback riding.

References

External links

 Virginia Department of Conservation and Recreation: Bear Creek Lake State Park
 Interactive Virtual Tour

Parks on the National Register of Historic Places in Virginia
State parks of Virginia
Parks in Cumberland County, Virginia
Protected areas established in 1940
Protected areas of Cumberland County, Virginia
1940 establishments in Virginia
National Register of Historic Places in Cumberland County, Virginia